John Yarde-Buller, 2nd Baron Churston (26 October 1846 – 19 April 1910) was a British peer and soldier.

The elder son of the Hon. John Yarde-Buller (eldest son of John Yarde-Buller, 1st Baron Churston) and of Charlotte, a daughter of Edward Sacheverell Chandos-Pole, of Radbourne, Derbyshire, he served in the Scots Guards until he succeeded to his grandfather's titles and estates (amounting to some eleven thousand acres) in 1871, retiring the same year as a Captain.

In 1872, he married Barbara, the only child of Sir Hastings Yelverton and of Barbara, 20th Baroness Grey de Ruthyn. They had one son and one daughter.

In 1910, Churston was succeeded by his son, the Hon. John Reginald Lopes Yarde-Buller.

He is the great-grandfather of Aga Khan IV.

References
CHURSTON, John Yarde-Buller, 2nd Baron (UK) cr 1858; JP in Who Was Who

2
Scots Guards officers
1846 births
1910 deaths
John